Pietro Marussig (16 May 1879 – 13 October 1937) was an Italian painter.

Biography
He was born in Trieste, and initially took lessons there from Eugenio Scomparini. He worked in Trieste from 1898 until 1918, and in Milan from 1919 until 1937. He painted in a representative expressionist style, depicting genre scenes, vedute, and portraits. He was part of a group of Milanese artists known as the Novecento Italiano who exhibited at the Permanente of Milan in 1926 and 1929, and included Anselmo Bucci, Leonardo Dudreville, Achille Funi, Gian Emilio Malerba, Ubaldo Oppi, and Mario Sironi. The group had fascist leanings and were cohered by Lino Pesaro, a gallery owner, and Margherita Sarfatti, a writer and art critic who would become Mussolini's mistress. Piero established circa 1930, a school in Milan along with Funi and Bortolotti.

References 

1879 births
1937 deaths
20th-century Italian painters
Italian male painters
Artists from Trieste
20th-century Italian male artists
Austro-Hungarian painters